Rape of Love (also known as L'amour violé) is a 1978 French and Belgian drama film directed and produced by Yannick Bellon. This film has been music composed by Aram Sedefian. The film starring Nathalie Nell, Alain Fourès, Michèle Simonnet, Pierre Arditi and Daniel Auteuil in the lead roles.

Cast
 Nathalie Nell
 Alain Fourès
 Michèle Simonnet
 Pierre Arditi
 Daniel Auteuil
 Bernard Granger
 Alain Marcel
 Gilles Tamiz
 Catherine Stermann

Production
Nathalie Nell said that after the gang rape scene she felt the same feeling as her character. Inexplicably, she felt ashamed "of the film crew, of future viewers". For several days, she struggled against the horror she inspired in herself, against the desire to hide, to no longer exist.

References

External links
 
 

1970s French-language films
1978 films
1978 drama films
French-language Belgian films
French drama films
Belgian drama films
1970s French films